Anguispira kochi is a species of gastropods belonging to the family Discidae. There are two subspecies, Anguispira kochi kochi or eastern banded tigersnail, and Anguispira kochi occidentalis or western banded tigersnail. The Eastern Banded Tigersnail was declared Endangered in Canada in 2017. 

The species is found in Northern America.

References

Discidae
Gastropods described in 1846
Endangered fauna of North America
Molluscs of Canada